Pamella Roland is an American fashion designer. She is the founder of the Pamella Roland, an evening wear line.

Education
After graduating from Michigan State University with a degree in business, Roland built an extensive professional background in marketing and public relations, working for nearly ten years in both corporate and agency environments.

Career
Roland debuted her first collection at New York Fashion Week in fall of 2002. Pamella Roland has since become a label of choice among Hollywood’s elite, including Angelina Jolie, Jennifer Garner, Halle Berry, Eva Longoria, and Kim Cattrall. In 2003, Roland received Gold Coast Award. In 2010, Roland was inducted into the Council of Fashion Designers of America (CFDA).

References

American fashion designers
American women fashion designers
Living people
Year of birth missing (living people)
21st-century American women